Nepeta is a genus of plant.

Nepeta may also refer to:

 HMS Nepeta, former name of the USS Pert
 Nepeta Leijon, a fictional character from the webcomic Homestuck